In physics, a fluxon is a quantum of electromagnetic flux.  The term may have any of several related meanings.

Superconductivity
The fluxon is a small whisker of normal phase surrounded by superconducting phase, and Supercurrents circulate around the normal core. The magnetic field through such a whisker and its neighborhood, which has size of the order of London penetration depth  (~100 nm), is quantized because of the phase properties of the magnetic vector potential in quantum electrodynamics, see magnetic flux quantum for details.

In the context of long Superconductor-Insulator-Superconductor Josephson tunnel junctions, a fluxon (aka Josephson vortex) is made of circulating supercurrents and has no normal core in the tunneling barrier. Supercurrents circulate just around the mathematical center of a fluxon, which is situated with the (insulating) Josephson barrier. Again, the magnetic flux created by circulating supercurrents is equal to a magnetic flux quantum  (or less, if the superconducting electrodes of the Josephson junction are thinner than ).

Magnetohydrodynamics modeling
In the context of numerical MHD modeling, a fluxon is a discretized magnetic field line, representing a finite amount of magnetic flux in a localized bundle in the model.  Fluxon models are explicitly designed to preserve the topology of the magnetic field, overcoming numerical resistivity effects in Eulerian models.

References

External links
 FLUX, a fluxon-based MHD simulator

Theoretical physics
Superconductivity
Josephson effect